R. Martin Klein is an American theater, film, and voice actor who went under the alias name Bob Marx in his earlier dubbing work during the '90s. He's best known for playing Gomamon/Ikkakumon in Digimon: Digital Monsters, Fukurou in Noein & Katsuhiko Jinnai in El Hazard. In addition to voiceovers, Klein has worked on theater and film productions too.

Filmography

Anime
 Battle B-Daman - The Big Cheese, Additional Voices
 Blue Dragon - Marumaro
 Cyborg 009 - Ivan Whisky/Cyborg 001
 Digimon: Digital Monsters - Bukamon/Gomamon/Ikkakumon (Adventure-Adventure 02), Professor Takenouchi (Adventure 02), Toshiaki Mori (Tamers), Additional Voices
 Digimon Data Squad - Gomamon, Zudomon
 Digimon Fusion - Archelomon, Bukamon
 Eagle Riders - Mallanox
 El Hazard - Katsuhiko Jinnai
 FLCL - Gaku
 Flint the Time Detective - Flint Hammerhead
 Giant Robo - Additional Voices
 Gatchaman - Solaris
 Hand Maid May - Kotaro Nanbara
 Hyper Doll - Kurageman
 Magical Meow Meow Taruto - Kakipi
 MÄR - Pozan
 Mirmo! - Kororo
 Mobile Suit Gundam: The 08th MS Team - Jidan Nickard
 Mon Colle Knights - Impy, Additional Voices
 Noein - Fukurou
 Zatch Bell! - Grisor

Non-anime
Animalia -  Iggy D'Iguana, Horble, Zed, Additional voices
Dwegons - Nosey Three Horn, Bloochip, Squats
 LeapFrog - Edison the Firefly (5 DVDs, as "Robert Mark Klein")
Lego Star Wars: The Padawan Menace - Chancellor Palpatine, Darth Sidious, Republic Guard

Live-Action
 Power Rangers in Space - Seymour (voice, uncredited)

Movies
 A Martian Christmas - Office Manager, Martian Officer (as "Robert Mark Klein")
 Alpha and Omega 2: A Howl-iday Adventure - Tony, Rouge#2 (as "Bill Lader")
 Alpha and Omega 4: The Legend of the Saw Tooth Cave - Tony (as "Bill Lader")
 Perfect Blue - Mr. Me-Mania
 Digimon: The Movie - Gomamon
 Meet the Fockers - Moe Focker (DVD Extended)
 Digimon Adventure tri. - Bukamon/Gomamon/Ikkakumon, Additional voices (as "Bob Klein")
 The Little Polar Bear - Lemming
 Digimon Adventure: Last Evolution Kizuna - Gomamon/Ikkakumon (as "Bob Klein")
 Cinderella and the Secret Prince - Manny (as "Bob Klein")

Video games
 .hack series - Harald Hoerwick, Marlo
 Digimon All-Star Rumble - Tentomon, MegaKabuterimon, TyrantKabuterimon, Gomamon, Plesiomon, Aegisdramon
 Paraworld - Trader
 Star Ocean: First Departure'' - Lias Warren

References

External links

Living people
American male voice actors
Year of birth missing (living people)